The 2022 Florida Cup was the eighth edition of Florida Cup, a friendly association football tournament played in the United States. It was contested from July 16 to 23, 2022. For the first time, the tournament featured a Florida Cup series called the Clash of Nations.

The teams scheduled for the series were English clubs Chelsea and Arsenal, American clubs Charlotte FC and Orlando City SC and Mexican club América. The series concluded with a match between Arsenal and Chelsea to decide the winner, with Arsenal winning 4–0.

Teams

Venues

Standings

Matches

Broadcasters

References

Florida Cup (soccer)
Florida Cup
Florida Cup
Florida Cup
Florida Cup
Florida Cup